The Deutschland class was a series of three Panzerschiffe (armored ships), a form of heavily armed cruiser, built by the Reichsmarine officially in accordance with restrictions imposed by the Treaty of Versailles. The design for the ships incorporated several radical innovations, including the first major use of welding in a warship and all-diesel propulsion. Due to their heavy armament of six  guns and lighter weight, the British began referring to the vessels as "pocket battleships". The Deutschland-class ships were initially classified as Panzerschiffe, but the Kriegsmarine reclassified them as heavy cruisers in February 1940.

The three ships were built between 1929 and 1936 by the Deutsche Werke in Kiel and the Reichsmarinewerft in Wilhelmshaven, seeing much service with the German Navy. All three vessels served on non-intervention patrols during the Spanish Civil War. While on patrol, Deutschland was attacked by Republican bombers, and in response, Admiral Scheer bombarded the port of Almería. In 1937, Admiral Graf Spee represented Germany at the Coronation Review for Britain's King George VI. For the rest of their peacetime careers, the ships conducted a series of fleet maneuvers in the Atlantic and visited numerous foreign ports in goodwill tours.

Before the outbreak of World War II, Deutschland and Admiral Graf Spee were deployed to the Atlantic to put them in position to attack Allied merchant traffic once war was declared. Admiral Scheer remained in port for periodic maintenance. Deutschland was not particularly successful on her raiding sortie, during which she sank or captured three ships. She then returned to Germany, where she was renamed Lützow. Admiral Graf Spee sank nine vessels in the South Atlantic before she was confronted by three British cruisers at the Battle of the River Plate. Although she damaged the British ships, she was herself damaged and her engines were in poor condition. Coupled with deceptive false British reports of  reinforcements, the state of the ship convinced Hans Langsdorff, her commander, to scuttle the ship outside Montevideo, Uruguay.

Lützow and Admiral Scheer were deployed to Norway in 1942 to join the attacks on Allied convoys to the Soviet Union. Admiral Scheer conducted Operation Wunderland in August 1942, a sortie into the Kara Sea to attack Soviet merchant shipping, though it ended without significant success. Lützow took part in the Battle of the Barents Sea in December 1942, a failed attempt to destroy a convoy. Both ships were damaged in the course of their deployment to Norway and eventually returned to Germany for repairs. They ended their careers bombarding advancing Soviet forces on the Eastern Front; both ships were destroyed by British bombers in the final weeks of the war. Lützow was raised and sunk as a target by the Soviet Navy, and Admiral Scheer was partially broken up in situ, with the remainder of the hulk buried beneath rubble.

Development 

Following Germany's defeat in World War I, the size of the German Navy, renamed the Reichsmarine, was limited by the Treaty of Versailles. The Navy was permitted a force of six pre-dreadnought battleships and six light cruisers; the ships could not be replaced until they were twenty years old. The gun caliber of any new ship was not regulated by the Treaty itself, though the Naval Inter-Allied Commission of Control (NIACC) created by the Treaty did have authority to regulate the armament of all new warships. The Allies assumed that with these limitations, only coastal defense ships similar to those operated by the Scandinavian navies could be built.

The Reichsmarines oldest battleship, was laid down in 1902 and could therefore be replaced legally in 1922. Design studies were considered starting in 1920, with two basic options: the Navy could build a heavily armored, slow, and small warship similar to a monitor, or a large, fast, and lightly armored vessel similar to a cruiser. Actual design work on the new type of armored ship began in 1923, but the German economy collapsed in 1924, forcing a temporary halt to the work. Admiral Hans Zenker, the commander in chief of the Reichsmarine, pushed hard for the navy to resume design work, and in 1925 three new proposals were drafted. In addition to two sketches prepared in 1923, this totaled five different designs. The three designs prepared in 1925—"II/30", "IV/30", and "V/30"—were armed with six  guns with varying levels of armor protection. The Reichsmarine eventually opted for  guns to avoid provoking the Allies and to ease pressures on the design staff.

The Reichsmarine held a conference to evaluate the designs in May 1925, though the results were inconclusive. Of particular importance was the continued French occupation of the Ruhr industrial area, which prevented Germany from quickly building large-caliber artillery. Nevertheless, the design staff prepared another set of designs, "I/35", a heavily armored ship with a single triple turret forward, and "VIII/30", a more lightly-armored ship with a pair of twin turrets. The Reichsmarine initially intended to lay down the first armored ship in 1926, but the design had not yet been finalized. The 1926 maneuvers informed the design staff that greater speed was desirable, and that year, a further two designs were submitted to Zenker. The initial design for Deutschland, ordered as "Panzerschiff A", was prepared in 1926 and finalized by 1928. Zenker announced on 11 June 1927 that the Navy had settled on one of several proposals for the new warships. The Reichsmarine had decided that the new ships would be armed with two triple turrets mounting 28 cm guns.

Political opposition to the new ships was significant. The Reichsmarine therefore decided to delay ordering the ship until after the Reichstag elections in 1928. The question over whether to build the new ships was a major issue in elections, particularly with the Social Democrats, who strongly opposed the new ships and campaigned with the slogan "Food not Panzerkreuzer." In May 1928, the elections were concluded and enough of a majority in favor of the new ships was elected; this included twelve seats won by Adolf Hitler's Nazi Party. An October 1928 attempt by the Communist Party of Germany to initiate a referendum against the construction failed. The first of the new ships was authorized in November 1928.

When the particulars of the design became known by the Allies, they attempted to prevent Germany from building them. In doing so, this would effectively abrogate the clauses in the Treaty of Versailles that limited Germany's naval power. Britain and the United States favored making concessions to Germany, but France refused to allow any revisions to the Treaty of Versailles. Since the ships did not violate the terms of the Treaty, the Allies could not prevent Germany from building them after a negotiated settlement proved unattainable.

Design

General characteristics 

The three Deutschland-class ships varied slightly in dimensions. The displacement of the three ships increased over the class. The ships were officially stated to be within the  limit of the Treaty of Versailles, however.

The ships' hulls were constructed with transverse steel frames; over 90 percent of the hulls used welding instead of the then standard riveting, which saved 15 percent of their total hull weight. These savings allowed the armament and armor to be increased. The hulls contained twelve watertight compartments and were fitted with a double bottom that extended for 92 percent of the length of the keel. As designed, the ship's complement comprised 33 officers and 586 enlisted men. After 1935, the crew was dramatically increased, to 30 officers and 921–1,040 sailors. While serving as a squadron flagship, an additional 17 officers and 85 enlisted men augmented the crew. The second flagship had an additional 13 officers and 59 sailors. The ships carried a number of smaller boats, including two picket boats, two barges, one launch, one pinnace, and two dinghies.

The Kriegsmarine considered the ships to be good sea boats, with a slight roll. As built, they were wet in a head sea, though this was significantly improved by the installation of a clipper bow in 1940–1941. The ships were highly maneuverable, particularly when the maneuvering setting for the diesel engines was used, in which half of the engines for each shaft were run in reverse. The ships heeled over up to 13 degrees with the rudder hard over. The low stern was wet in a stern sea, and equipment stored there was frequently lost overboard.

Machinery 

The Deutschland-class ships were equipped with two sets of four 9-cylinder, double-acting, two-stroke diesel engines built by MAN. The adoption of an all-diesel propulsion system was a radical innovation at the time and contributed to significant savings in weight. Each set was controlled by transmissions built by AG Vulcan. Deutschland was initially fitted with  diameter screws, before they were replaced with the larger screws. They did not meet the expected shaft-horsepower on trials, though they did exceed their design speeds.

Electricity was supplied by four electric generators powered by two diesel engines. Their total output was 2,160 kW for Deutschland, 2,800 kW for Admiral Scheer, and 3,360 kW for Admiral Graf Spee, all at 220 volts. Steering was controlled by a single rudder.

Armament 

The three Deutschland-class ships were armed with a main battery of six 28 cm SK C/28 guns mounted in two triple turrets, one on either end of the superstructure. The turrets were the Drh LC/28 type and allowed elevation to 40 degrees, and depression to −8 degrees. The guns were initially supplied with a total 630 rounds of ammunition, and this was later increased to 720 shells.

The secondary battery comprised eight 15 cm SK C/28 guns, each in single MPLC/28 mountings arranged amidships. They were supplied with a total of 800 rounds of ammunition, though later in their careers this was increased to 1,200 rounds. The ships were also equipped with eight  torpedo tubes placed in two quadruple launchers mounted on their stern.

As built, the ships' anti-aircraft battery consisted of three 8.8 cm SK L/45 anti-aircraft guns in single mounts. These were replaced in 1935 with six 8.8 cm SK C/31 guns in twin mounts. Admiral Graf Spee and Deutschland were rearmed in 1938 and 1940, respectively, with six 10.5 cm L/65 guns, four 3.7 cm SK C/30 guns and initially ten 2 cm Flak guns—the number of 2 cm guns on Deutschland was eventually increased to 28. Admiral Scheer had been rearmed by 1945 with six  guns, eight 3.7 cm guns, and thirty-three 2 cm guns.

Armor 

The bow and stern were unarmored at the waterline. This belt was inclined to increase its protective qualities and supplemented by a  longitudinal splinter bulkhead. The upper edge of the belt on Deutschland and Admiral Scheer was at the level of the armored deck. On Admiral Graf Spee, it was extended one deck higher. Admiral Scheer and Admiral Graf Spee had  main decks and armored decks that ranged in thickness from 17–45 mm. The armored deck in Deutschland and Admiral Scheer did not extend over the entire width of the ship due to weight; this matter was rectified in Admiral Graf Spee. Likewise, the torpedo bulkheads for Deutschland and Admiral Scheer stopped at the inside of the double-bottom but in Admiral Graf Spee extended to the outer hull. The 15 cm guns were armored with  gun shields for splinter protection.

Admiral Scheer and Admiral Graf Spee had some improvements in armor thickness. The barbettes, 100 mm thick in Deutschland, became 125 mm for the two sisters. Admiral Scheer had the belt somewhat improved, and Admiral Graf Spee had a much more improved 100 mm belt, instead of 50–80 mm. The armored deck was improved as well, and some places had up to 70 mm thickness.<ref>Whitley, M.J. German Capital Ships of World War Two, Arm and armour press, London 1989</ref>

Classification
The Kriegsmarine initially classified the ships as "Panzerschiffe" (armored ships), but in February 1940 it reclassified the two survivors of the class as heavy cruisers. Due to their heavy armament of six 28 cm (11 in) guns, high speed and long cruising range, the class was more capable of high seas operation than the old pre-dreadnought battleships they replaced; for this reason, they were referred to as "pocket battleships", particularly in the British press. In 1938 Jane's Fighting Ships stated the Deutschland-class "[a]re officially rated as 'Armoured Ships' (Panzerschiffe) and popularly referred to as 'Pocket Battleships'. Actually, they are equivalent to armoured cruisers of an exceptionally powerful type."

 Construction Deutschland was laid down at the Deutsche Werke shipyard in Kiel on 5 February 1929, under the contract name Panzerschiff A, as a replacement for the old battleship Preussen. Work began under construction number 219. The ship was launched on 19 May 1931; at her launching, she was christened by German Chancellor Heinrich Brüning. The ship accidentally started sliding down the slipway while Brüning was giving his christening speech. After the completion of fitting out work, initial sea trials began in November 1932. The ship was commissioned into the Reichsmarine on 1 April 1933.

Serious political opposition to the ships continued after the authorization for Deutschland, and a political crisis over the second ship, Admiral Scheer, was averted only after the Social Democrats abstained from voting. As a result of the opposition, Panzerschiff B was not authorized until 1931. A replacement for the old battleship , her keel was laid on 25 June 1931 at the Reichsmarinewerft shipyard in Wilhelmshaven, under construction number 123. The ship was launched on 1 April 1933; at her launching, she was christened by Marianne Besserer, the daughter of Admiral Reinhard Scheer, after whom the ship was named. She was completed slightly over a year and a half later on 12 November 1934, the day she was commissioned into the German fleet.Admiral Graf Spee, the third and final member of the class, was also ordered by the Reichsmarine from the Kriegsmarinewerft shipyard in Wilhelmshaven. She was ordered under the contract name Panzerschiff C to replace the battleship . Her keel was laid on 1 October 1932, under construction number 125. The ship was launched on 30 June 1934; at her launching, she was christened by the daughter of Admiral Maximilian von Spee, after whom the ship was named. She was completed slightly over a year and a half later on 6 January 1936, the day she was commissioned into the German fleet.

 Possible conversion 

After Hitler had given the order in late January 1943 for the two remaining ships to be scrapped, the possibility of instead converting them into aircraft carriers was discussed. Conversion time was estimated at two years. Their flight deck would have been only  shorter than that of the Hipper-class heavy cruiser , which had been prepared for conversion in 1942, and they would still have attained 28 knots. This plan was not pursued.

 Ships in class 

 Deutschland Deutschland saw significant action with the Kriegsmarine, including several non-intervention patrols, during which she was attacked by Republican bombers. At the outbreak of World War II, she was cruising the North Atlantic, prepared to attack Allied merchant traffic. Bad weather hampered her efforts, and she sank or captured only three vessels before returning to Germany, after which she was renamed Lützow. She then participated in Operation Weserübung, the invasion of Norway. Damaged at the Battle of Drøbak Sound, she was recalled to Germany for repairs. While en route, she was torpedoed by a British submarine and seriously damaged.

Repairs were completed by March 1941, and in June Lützow steamed to Norway. While en route, she was torpedoed by a British bomber, necessitating significant repairs that lasted until May 1942. She returned to Norway to join the forces arrayed against Allied shipping to the Soviet Union. She ran aground during a planned attack on convoy PQ 17, which necessitated another return to Germany for repairs. She next saw action at the Battle of the Barents Sea with the heavy cruiser , which ended with a failure to destroy the convoy JW 51B. Engine problems forced a series of repairs culminating in a complete overhaul at the end of 1943, after which the ship remained in the Baltic. Sunk in the Kaiserfahrt in April 1945 by Royal Air Force (RAF) bombers, Lützow was used as a gun battery to support German troops fighting the Soviet Army until 4 May 1945, when she was disabled by her crew. Raised by the Soviet Navy in 1947, she was reportedly broken up for scrap over the next two years, according to Western works that did not have access to Soviet documents at the time. The historian Hans Georg Prager examined the former Soviet archives in the early 2000s, and discovered that Lützow actually had been sunk in weapons tests in July 1947.

 Admiral Scheer Admiral Scheer saw heavy service with the German Navy, including several deployments to Spain during the Spanish Civil War, to participate in non-intervention patrols. While off Spain, she bombarded the port of Almería following the Republican attack on her sister Deutschland. At the outbreak of World War II, she remained in port for a periodic refit. Her first operation during World War II was a commerce raiding operation into the southern Atlantic Ocean that started in late October 1940. While on the operation, she also made a brief foray into the Indian Ocean. During the raiding mission, she sank  of shipping, making her the most successful capital ship surface raider of the war.

Following her return to Germany, she was deployed to northern Norway to interdict shipping to the Soviet Union. She was part of the abortive attack on Convoy PQ 17 with the battleship ; the operation was broken off after surprise was lost. She also conducted Operation Wunderland, a sortie into the Kara Sea. After returning to Germany at the end of 1942, the ship served as a training ship until the end of 1944, when she was used to support ground operations against the Soviet Army. She was sunk by British bombers on 9 April 1945 and partially scrapped; the remainder of the wreck lies buried beneath a quay.

 Admiral Graf Spee Admiral Graf Spee conducted extensive training in the Baltic and Atlantic before participating in five non-intervention patrols during the Spanish Civil War in 1936–1938. She also represented Germany during the Coronation Review for King George VI in May 1937. Admiral Graf Spee was deployed to the South Atlantic in the weeks before the outbreak of World War II, to be positioned in merchant sea lanes once war was declared. Between September and December 1939, the ship sank nine ships totaling ; in response, the British and French navies formed several hunter-killer groups to track her down. These forces included four aircraft carriers, two battleships, and one battlecruiser.Admiral Graf Spee operated in concert with the supply ship . Admiral Graf Spee'' was eventually confronted by three British cruisers off Uruguay at the Battle of the River Plate on 13 December 1939. She inflicted heavy damage on the British ships, but suffered damage as well, and was forced to put into port at Montevideo. Convinced by false reports of superior British naval forces approaching his ship and the poor state of his own engines, Hans Langsdorff, the commander of the ship, ordered the vessel to be scuttled. Langsdorff committed suicide three days after the scuttling. The ship was partially broken up in situ, though part of the ship remains visible above the surface of the water.

Footnotes 

Notes

Citations

References 
 
 
 
 
 
 
 
 
 
 
 
 
 
 
 
 
 

Cruiser classes